Denmark competed at the 1936 Summer Olympics in Berlin, Germany. 121 competitors, 105 men and 16 women, took part in 71 events in 14 sports.

Medalists

Athletics

Boxing

Canoeing

Cycling

Eleven cyclists, all men, represented Denmark in 1936.

Individual road race
 Frode Sørensen
 Arne Petersen
 Knud Jacobsen
 Tage Møller

Team road race
 Frode Sørensen
 Arne Petersen
 Knud Jacobsen
 Tage Møller

Sprint
 Karl Magnussen

Time trial
 Arne Pedersen

Tandem
 Heino Dissing
 Bjørn Stiler

Team pursuit
 Karl Magnussen
 Erik Friis
 Helge Jacobsen
 Hans Christian Nielsen
 Arne Pedersen

Diving

Women

Equestrian

 Hans Lunding 
 Niels Erik Leschly
 Peter Jensen
 Vincens Grandjean

Fencing

Nine fencers, six men and three women, represented Denmark in 1936.

Men's foil
 Aage Leidersdorff
 Svend Jacobsen
 Caspar Schrøder

Men's team foil
 Erik Hammer Sørensen, Kim Bærentzen, Aage Leidersdorff, Caspar Schrøder, Svend Jacobsen

Men's épée
 Preben Christiansen
 Erik Hammer Sørensen
 Aage Leidersdorff

Men's team épée
 Erik Hammer Sørensen, Caspar Schrøder, Aage Leidersdorff, Preben Christiansen

Men's sabre
 Aage Leidersdorff
 Preben Christiansen
 Erik Hammer Sørensen

Men's team sabre
 Erik Hammer Sørensen, Preben Christiansen, Aage Leidersdorff, Svend Jacobsen

Women's foil
 Karen Lachmann
 Grete Olsen
 Ulla Barding-Poulsen

Field hockey

Rowing

Denmark had 16 rowers participate in five out of seven rowing events in 1936.

 Men's coxless pair
 Richard Olsen
 Harry Larsen

 Men's coxed pair
 Remond Larsen
 Carl Berner
 Aage Jensen (cox)

 Men's coxless four
 Knud Olsen
 Keld Karise
 Bjørner Drøger
 Emil Boje Jensen

 Men's coxed four
 Hans Mikkelsen
 Gunnar Ibsen Sørensen
 Flemming Jensen
 Svend Aage Holm Sørensen
 Aage Jensen (cox)

 Men's eight
 Remond Larsen
 Olaf Klitgaard Poulsen
 Poul Byrge Poulsen
 Keld Karise
 Bjørner Drøger
 Carl Berner
 Knud Olsen
 Emil Boje Jensen
 Harry Gregersen (cox)

Sailing

Shooting

Six shooters represented Denmark in 1936.

25 m rapid fire pistol
 Erik Sætter-Lassen
 Axel Lerche
 Christen Møller

50 m pistol
 Julius Lehrmann
 Christen Møller

50 m rifle, prone
 Vilhelm Johansen
 Erik Sætter-Lassen
 Julius Hansen

Swimming
Source:
Men
 Børge Bæth (100 m backstroke)
 John Christensen (100 m and 4 × 200 m freestyle) 
 Aage Hellstrøm (400 m,1500 m and 4 × 200 m freestyle) 
 Finn Jensen (200 m breaststroke)  
 Jørgen Jørgensen (400 m,1500 m and 4 × 200 m)
 Hans Malmstrøm (200 m breaststroke) 
 Poul Petersen (100 m, 400 m and 4 × 200 m freestyle)
 Erik Skou (200 m breaststroke) 
Women
 Eva Arndt-Riise (100 m freestyle and 4 × 100 m freestyle)
 Inger Carlsen (400 m freestyle)
 Valborg Christensen (200 m breaststroke)
 Grete Frederiksen (400 m freestyle)
 Ragnhild Hveger (100 m freestyle, 4 × 100 m freestyle and 400 m freestyle)   
 Tove Bruunstrøm Madsen (100 m backstroke)   
 Tove Nielsen (100 m backstroke)
 Edel Nielsen (200 m breaststroke)   
 Inge Sørensen (200 m breaststroke)   
 Elvi Svendsen (100 m freestyle and 4 × 100 m freestyle)

Diving
Women
 Mette Gregaard
 Karen Margrete Andersen

Wrestling

Art competitions

References

Nations at the 1936 Summer Olympics
1936
Summer Olympics